Vorobyovskaya is a rural locality (a village) in Oshevenskoye Rural Settlement of Kargopolsky District, Arkhangelsk Oblast, Russia. The population was 49 as of 2010.

Geography 
Vorobyovskaya is located 27 km north of Kargopol (the district's administrative centre) by road. Agafonovskaya is the nearest rural locality.

References 

Rural localities in Kargopolsky District